Vera Zvonareva was the 2009 defending champion, but chose not to participate that year.

Shahar Pe'er won the title, defeating Alberta Brianti in the final 6–3, 6–4.

Seeds

Draw

Finals

Top half

Bottom half

External links
 Main draw
 Qualifying draw

Guangzhou International Women's Open
Guangzhou International Women's Open - Singles